At various dates in the run up to the 2019 general election, various organisations carried out opinion polling to gauge the opinions that voters hold towards political leaders. Results of such polls are displayed in this article. Most of the polling companies listed are members of the British Polling Council (BPC) and abide by its disclosure rules.

The date range for these opinion polls is from the previous general election, held on 8 June 2017, to the present day. Under the Fixed-term Parliaments Act 2011, the next general election was scheduled to be held no later than 5 May 2022, and it was accelerated from that timetable by the Early Parliamentary General Election Act 2019, meaning polling day fell on 12 December 2019.

Leadership approval ratings

Boris Johnson 

The following polls asked about voters' opinions on Boris Johnson, Leader of the Conservatives and Prime Minister of the United Kingdom.

2019

Jeremy Corbyn 

The following polls asked about voters' opinions on Jeremy Corbyn, Leader of the Labour Party and Leader of the Opposition.

2019

2018

2017

Jo Swinson 

The following polls asked about voters' opinions on Jo Swinson, Leader of the Liberal Democrats.

2019

Nigel Farage 

The following polls asked about voters' opinions on Nigel Farage, Leader of the Brexit Party since 22 March 2019.

2019

Nicola Sturgeon 

The following polls asked about British voters' opinions on Nicola Sturgeon, Leader of the Scottish National Party and First Minister of Scotland. Note that these polls asked the opinions of British voters as a whole, not specifically for Scottish Voters (see below).

2019

2018

2017

Approval ratings for former party leaders

Theresa May 

The following polls asked about voters' opinions on Theresa May, former Leader of the Conservatives and former Prime Minister of the United Kingdom.

2019

2018

2017

Vince Cable 

The following polls asked about voters' opinions on Sir Vince Cable, former Leader of the Liberal Democrats from 20 July 2017 to 22 July 2019.

2019

2018

2017

Heidi Allen 
The following polls asked about voters' opinions on Heidi Allen, Acting Leader of Change UK from 29 March 2019 to 4 June 2019.

2019

Gerard Batten 

The following polls asked about voters' opinions on Gerard Batten, who served as Leader of the UK Independence Party from 14 April 2018 to 2 June 2019, and Acting Leader between 17 February 2018 and 14 April 2018.

2019

2018

Anna Soubry 
The following polls asked about voters' opinions on Anna Soubry, Leader of Change UK since 4 June 2019.

2019

Henry Bolton 

The following polls asked about voters' opinions on Henry Bolton, who served as Leader of the UK Independence Party from 29 September 2017 until 17 February 2018.

2018

2017

Tim Farron 

The following polls asked about voters' opinions on Tim Farron, who was Leader of the Liberal Democrats from 16 July 2015 until 20 July 2017.

Paul Nuttall 

The following polls asked about voters' opinions on Paul Nuttall, who was Leader of the UK Independence Party from 28 November 2016 until 9 June 2017. These polls were conducted after his resignation and asked how voters how they felt he had handled his job.

Approval polling in Scotland

The polls below were conducted amongst voters in Scotland only, and asked about their opinions on both Scottish and UK-wide political leaders.

Boris Johnson

The following polls asked about Scottish voters' opinions on Boris Johnson, Prime Minister of the United Kingdom and Leader of the Conservative Party.

Jeremy Corbyn

The following polls asked about Scottish voters' opinions on Jeremy Corbyn, Leader of the Labour Party and Leader of the Opposition.

Nicola Sturgeon

The following polls asked about Scottish voters' opinions on Nicola Sturgeon, Leader of the Scottish National Party and First Minister of Scotland.

Nigel Farage

The following polls asked about Scottish voters' opinions on Nigel Farage, Leader of the Brexit Party.

Richard Leonard

The following polls asked about Scottish voters' opinions on Richard Leonard, Leader of the Scottish Labour Party.

Patrick Harvie

The following polls asked about Scottish voters' opinions on Patrick Harvie, Co-Convenor of the Scottish Green Party.

Former Party Leaders

Theresa May

The following polls asked about Scottish voters' opinions on Theresa May, former Leader of the Conservatives and Prime Minister of the United Kingdom.

Vince Cable

The following polls asked about Scottish voters' opinions on Vince Cable, former Leader of the Liberal Democrats.

Ruth Davidson

The following polls asked about Scottish voters' opinions on Ruth Davidson, former Leader of the Scottish Conservative Party.

Preferred Prime Minister polling 
Some opinion pollsters ask voters which party leader they would prefer as Prime Minister — Boris Johnson (Conservative Party) or Jeremy Corbyn (Labour Party). The questions differ slightly from pollster to pollster:

Opinium: "Which, if any, of the following people do you think would be the best prime minister?"
BMG Research: "If you had to choose between the two, who would you prefer to see as the next Prime Minister?"
YouGov / Survation: "Which of the following do you think would make the best Prime Minister?"
Ipsos MORI: "Who do you think would make the most capable Prime Minister, the Conservatives’ Boris Johnson, or Labour’s Jeremy Corbyn?"
ICM: "Putting aside which party you support, and only thinking about your impressions of them as leaders, which one of the following do you think would make the best Prime Minister for Britain?"

Johnson vs Corbyn

2019

4-way polling

2019

May vs Corbyn

2019

2018

2017

Hypothetical polling

2018

2017

Most trusted to negotiate Brexit 

Some opinion pollsters ask voters which party leader they trust most to negotiate the best Brexit deal for Britain. The questions vary:

Survation: "Which of the following party leaders do you trust the most to negotiate the best deal for Britain leaving the EU?"
YouGov: "Who would you trust most to negotiate Britain's exit from the European Union?"
 ICM: "For each of the following challenges facing Britain, who would you trust most to do the best job: Theresa May or Jeremy Corbyn? (Negotiating a good Brexit deal for the UK)"

Johnson vs Corbyn

2019

May vs Corbyn

2018

2017

May vs Corbyn vs Cable

2017

Hypothetical polling

Prime Minister and Chancellor of the Exchequer 

Some opinion pollsters ask voters which party leader and Chancellor/Shadow Chancellor they trust most to manage the economy. The questions vary:

 ICM (29 July 2019): "For each of the following challenges facing Britain, who would you trust most to do the best job - Theresa May/Boris Johnson or Jeremy Corbyn? (Managing the economy properly)"
 ICM: " Irrespective of which party you support, which of the teams below do you think is better able to manage the economy properly?"
 Opinium: " Which, if any, of the following would you say you trust more to handle the economy?"
 YouGov: "Which government do you think would be better for managing the economy?"
 Deltapoll: "Putting aside any support for a political party you may have, which of the following do you think would be best for the British economy?"

During the Johnson ministry

2019

During the May ministry

2019

2018

2017

Best Chancellor of the Exchequer 

Some opinion pollsters ask voters which politician would make the best Chancellor of the Exchequer. The questions vary:

 YouGov: "Which of these would make the better Chancellor of the Exchequer?"
 Ipsos MORI: "Who do you think would make the most capable Chancellor, the Conservative’s Phillip Hammond/Sajid Javid, or Labour’s John McDonnell?"

Hammond vs McDonnell (2018)

See also 
 Opinion polling for the next United Kingdom general election
 Next United Kingdom general election

Notes

References

Leadership approval opinion polling for United Kingdom general elections